DRB LasGidi (previously known as "Rap Royals") is a Nigerian musical group. It was formed in 2007 by Tobi Ajayi, Tobenna Ofili, and Ladi Lanre. Teniola Zaccheaus joined later.

History 
Rap Royals officially kicked off with rapping and singing. They recorded over 5 tracks a day, made various freestyles to other known instrumentals and started to get a 'buzz' within their circle. Tobenna wrote the hooks with Tobi, while Ladi, and Teniola handled the rapping.

Ladi became known as Fresh L, Teniola as TZ (TeeZee) and Tobi as Tobias. Their first CD was "Coronation Vol.1".  Dayo Ogundare, BOJ and others appeared on this mixtape.

"Marry You" was released over email. This was their first afrobeats track as a group. BOJ and Tobenna made the beat and laid down verses, while Fresh L rapped. It found favor on party playlists and then on a Lagos radio station.

Bolaji Odojukan aka BOJ then joined the group. Initially, he rapped on a few tracks, then left his unique vocals for a moment after 'Marry You' was recorded.

DRB 
The group started working with producer Ife Otedola. "Wait A Minute" got positive reviews, with rapper J.Rah jumping in. Originally a solo artist, he affiliated with Rap Royals. They performed at Concrete Rose. The group changed its name to DRB (Double R "Rap Royals" Boys). New members included 3feat, Yung Didz and IC. Gidilounge made a viral interview video.

"She Likes To" freestyle, involved non-DRB rappers.

In 2008, the "Beats N Bars" mixtape was made by FreshL and Tobenna with an appearance from 3feat. In 2009, "Hooks N Bars" mixtape was made and in 2010 "HarDrive" mixtape was made, featuring JRah, Costels, Phlowz, Stan and Davido, with production from Adey.

"Bad Man Jump" was DRB's single of that year and in the summer, the track took off with over 10,000 downloads.

DRB LasGidi/Creative Elevation 
In 2011, as the team expanded, a decision was made to include Phlowz, Stan, Woodsy and Uzee as part of TeamDRB. Later that year, the team divided into Afro-beats vs UK. TZ, FreshL and BOJ were now DRB LasGidi (Afro-beats) while the rest were now Creative Elevation (CE) founded by Phlowz and Tobenna. Collectively, the movement is known as CEDRB, with their close friends Joey, Jerry, Ik, Ausboss and KC moving in with the group.

DRB LasGidi focused on the African market. Tenny Karim (known as TK) became their manager, working with BOJ, FreshL and TZ. He had connections in the industry. Their first release was one of BOJ's 2008 vocals that they repolished, becoming "Gra Gra". Fresh L was up next with "Bring Out The Rose" dropping in October, featuring TeeZee and produced by Adey. This was a "banger" according to DJ's and was played in clubs and on radio. TeeZee released his own track, "Swagga Mi Gbono" featuring BOJ, produced by K-Logic. This was also a club hit and got radio play. Old fans were excited about this new force, and DRB LasGidi generated a lot more supporters between July and December 2011. In Christmas of that year, BOJ and TeeZee made a trip to Lagos, and Fresh L stayed in London to work on some music, hoping to gain inspiration.

2012, LXIX was made and released 3 days before DRBs first single "Toyin", which was produced by DJ Caise. This track was a hit with about 25,000 downloads in the first month and over 20,000 plays on blogs. FJ Ayodeji joined DRB LasGidi as their assistant manager and handled the finance from tours and bookings, Papi YT became creative director and Ola (Bado) gave fashion inspiration and was a major advisor. He and his team, MV (Jimmy & Anthony), are closely affiliated to DRB. Wunmi Bakare handles public relations. She also works for one of Nigeria's biggest female artists, Tiwa Savage. The music video for "Toyin" was released during the summer of 2012 with DRB's 2nd single due to be released.

Discography

Albums

Solo discography

References

External links

DRB LasGidi on Tumblr

Musical groups established in 2007